The River Road School is located in Lyndhurst, Bergen County, New Jersey, United States. The schoolhouse was built in 1893 and is the home of the Lyndhurst Historical Society. The schoolhouse was added to the National Register of Historic Places on November 11, 1977.

History
A piece of land was donated on January 9, 1804, by Jacob Van Winkle for the construction of a school. The first schoolhouse was erected that year at a cost of $162.20. The first schoolhouse was replaced in 1849 by a two-story frame building. This second schoolhouse was torn down in 1893 and replaced by the current building at a cost of $2,541.83. The cupola and bell from the second schoolhouse were salvaged and added to the current schoolhouse.

Little Red Schoolhouse
The Lyndhurst Historical Society operates the building as the Little Red Schoolhouse, a museum of local history.

See also

 National Register of Historic Places listings in Bergen County, New Jersey
 Jacob W. Van Winkle House
 Jeremiah J. Yeareance House

References

External links
 Lyndhurst Historical Society

Buildings and structures in Bergen County, New Jersey
Lyndhurst, New Jersey
School buildings on the National Register of Historic Places in New Jersey
Former school buildings in the United States
School buildings completed in 1893
Queen Anne architecture in New Jersey
Defunct schools in New Jersey
Museums in Bergen County, New Jersey
History museums in New Jersey
National Register of Historic Places in Bergen County, New Jersey
New Jersey Register of Historic Places